Kuźmina  is a village in the administrative district of Gmina Bircza, within Przemyśl County, Subcarpathian Voivodeship, in south-eastern Poland.

The village has a population of 480.

References

Villages in Przemyśl County